The Eurovision Young Musicians 2014 was the seventeenth edition of the Eurovision Young Musicians, held outside the Cologne Cathedral in Cologne, Germany, on 31 May 2014. Organised by the European Broadcasting Union (EBU) and host broadcaster Westdeutscher Rundfunk (WDR), musicians from fourteen countries participated in the televised final. This was the fifth time that the competition was held on an open-air stage.

All participants performed a classical piece of their choice accompanied by the WDR Symphony Orchestra, conducted by Kristiina Poska. This year, 14 countries participated in the contest.  and  made their debut at the Eurovision Young Musicians.

Ziyu He of Austria won the contest, with Slovenia and Hungary placing second and third respectively. 
In 2014, Austria also won the Eurovision Song Contest.

Location

Roncalliplatz, a square outside the Cologne Cathedral, was the host location for the 2014 edition of the Eurovision Young Musicians.

Format

Sabine Heinrich was the host of the 2014 contest. Flying Steps performed as the interval act.

The semi final stage of the contest was dropped this year, however a preliminary round was held over two days on 26 & 27 May and streamed live on youngmusicians.tv. Each musician was required to play for up to 15 minutes in this round and a maximum of five minutes in the Grand Final on 31 May. The international jury scored each musician and performance during the preliminary round. The scores were added to those given in the Grand Final to decide the three prize winners.

The candidates were accompanied by the WDR Symphony Orchestra, under the leadership of Estonian conductor Kristiina Poska. The winner will have a chance to appear with the Vienna Philharmonic Orchestra in 2015.

Participating countries 
All participating countries automatically qualified for the final on 31 May 2014. The semi final elimination stage was replaced by a two-day preliminary round, that was held on 26 and 27 May respectively at the Kleiner Sendesaal in WDR's Funkhaus Wallrafplatz. The professional jury awarded points in this round.

Preliminary round

Part 1 (26 May 2014)

Part 2 (27 May 2014)

Final
Awards were given to the top three countries. The table below highlights these using gold, silver, and bronze. The placing results of the remaining participants is unknown and never made public by the European Broadcasting Union.

Jury members 
The list of jury members are as follows:

 – Clemens Hellsberg (chairman)
 – Markus Pawlik (Winner of the 1982 Contest)
  – Carol McGonnell
  – Maurice Steger
  – Uroš Lajović

Broadcasting
The contest was broadcast by the following broadcasters:

Other countries
 – National State Television and Radio Company of the Republic of Belarus (BTRC) informed Oikotimes that they would be withdrawing from Eurovision Young Musicians on 6 January 2014.
 – National Television Company of Ukraine (NTU) confirmed to Eurovoix.com that Ukraine would not take part in EYM 2014 on 23 January 2014.

See also
 ABU Radio Song Festival 2014
 ABU TV Song Festival 2014
 Eurovision Song Contest 2014
 Junior Eurovision Song Contest 2014
 Türkvizyon Song Contest 2014

References

External links 

  
 Eurovision Young Musicians  – European Broadcasting Union

2014 in German music
2014 in music
Eurovision Young Musicians by year
Music festivals in Germany
Events in Cologne
May 2014 events in Europe